The 2009–10 Welsh Premier League was the 18th season of the Welsh Premier League since its establishment in 1992 as the League of Wales. It began on 14 August 2009 and ended on 24 April 2010. Rhyl were the defending champions.

Teams
Bala Town were promoted from the Cymru Alliance and played in the top division for the first time in their history. Caersws survived relegation for a second straight year after ENTO Aberaman Athletic failed in their appeal to get a domestic licence after their floodlights were not up to the Welsh FA's expectations. None of the remaining top two teams in the Welsh Football League First Division could meet ground regulations.

The league was reduced to a size of 12 teams after this season following a unanimous decision by the Premier League clubs in June 2009. As a result of this, six clubs were relegated. The number of relegated teams could also have been seven or eight (the maximum), depending on whether any Cymru Alliance / Welsh Football League First Division clubs were eligible to be promoted to the 2010–11 Premier League. None of them were, so six teams were relegated, including last season's champions Rhyl.

Team summaries

Managerial changes

League table

Results

Top scorers
Source: welsh-premier.com

Awards

Monthly awards

Annual awards

Player of the season
 Winner:

Liam McCreesh (Port Talbot Town)

 Nominated:

Steve Evans (The New Saints), Martin Rose (Port Talbot Town)

Young player of the season
 Winner:

Craig Jones (The New Saints)

 Nominated:

Scott Barrow (Port Talbot Town), Jamie Reed (Bangor City)

Manager of the season
 Winner:

Neville Powell (Bangor City)

 Nominated:

Andy Cale (The New Saints), Mark Jones (Port Talbot Town)

Team of the Season

Source:

Welsh clubs in Europe 2009–10

UEFA Champions League

After winning the league in 2008/09 Rhyl represented the league in the premier football competition, they started in the second qualifying round with a trick tie with Serbian club Partizan Belgrade. They were beaten 4–0 at home in the first leg, and hammered 8–0 in Serbia in the second leg, thus ending their participation in Europe for the season.

UEFA Europa League

The New Saints and Llanelli started in the first qualifying round of the competition. TNS were drawn against Fram from Iceland and Llanelli were handed an interesting tie with Motherwell from Scotland.
In a good first leg for both sides, Llanelli produced the shock of the round with a 1–0 away win against Motherwell, giving them a wonderful chance of progression. TNS also had a good chance after a respectable 2–1 defeat in Iceland.

The second legs were disappointing however, as even though TNS took an early lead which would have earned them progression, Fram turned the game around and won 2–1, thus knocking out TNS from European competition for another season. Llanelli were also disappointed, losing 3–0 at home to Motherwell which put them out as well.

Bangor City were the only Welsh side in European competition when they started their Europa League campaign in the second qualifying round against FC Honka from Finland. They had hope of progression and this was compounded by a positive 2–0 defeat in Finland, but they lost the home leg 1–0, which knocked them out and ended Wales' participation in European competition for 2009.

UEFA ranking

The Welsh league picked a disappointing 0.250 for their participation in European competition in 2009, the only points coming from Llanelli's away win against Motherwell.

The league was ranked 46th out of 53 leagues in Europe by UEFA after the 2009–10 season.

 44  Albania
 45  Armenia
 46  Wales
 47  Montenegro
 48  Faroe Islands
 Full list

References

External links
 Welsh Premier League Football

Cymru Premier seasons
1